Timeabout (stylized as Timeabout,) is the first extended play by Japanese musician Yukika Teramoto, released on April 7, 2021 by Ubuntu Entertainment and distributed by YG Plus. It is her first release under Ubuntu following her departure from Estimate Entertainment in November 2020. Released eight months after her debut album Soul Lady, the EP is also influenced by Japanese city pop and is characterized by its heavy use of retro synthesizers, bass guitar and disco-inspired percussion. It is intended to be the first entry of a "Time" trilogy.

Release and promotion 
On February 21, 2021, Teramoto's label announced that she would be releasing an EP during the first half of the year alongside a teaser photo titled "Past: Illusion One". The first single "Lovemonth" was subsequently announced on February 24. "Lovemonth" was released on March 2 and peaked at 143 on the Gaon Download Chart. A release schedule was posted on March 25, revealing the track listing, release date, as well as teaser photos and videos over the weeks leading up to April 7.

The EP was released on April 7 in yellow and blue variations. A music video for the track "Insomnia" was released on the same day and depicts Teramoto traveling to the past to motivate her younger self, intercut with shots of a clock filling with water.

To promote Timeabout, Teramoto appeared on various music programs throughout April, performing "Insomnia" on Show Champion and The Show.

Track listing 
Timeabout track listingNotes:

 "Time Travel" and "Pung!" are stylized in all caps.

Personnel 
Credits adapted from Melon.

Charts 

Weekly

Monthly

Sales

Release history

References 

2021 EPs
K-pop EPs
Yukika Teramoto albums